Ajahn Fuang Jotiko (191514 May 1986) was a Thai Buddhist monk and abbot in the Thai Forest Tradition of Theravada Buddhism.

Fuang was a student of Ajahn Lee at Wat Asokaram, a monastery near Bangkok. After Ajahn Lee's death in 1961, Fuang continued at Wat Asokaram where he was expected to become abbot. However, in 1965 Fuang left to pursue greater solitude which he felt would improve his meditation practice. About 1971, Fuang moved to Wat Thamma Sathit in Rayong Province, where he lived as abbot until his death in 1986. Fuang's students included American monk Ṭhānissaro Bhikkhu, who studied with him for ten years.

Published works

Citations

References

Further reading

External links 
 Photograph from Metta Forest Monastery

1915 births
1986 deaths
Buddhist abbots
Fuang Jotiko
Fuang Jotiko
20th-century Buddhist monks